Portland, Oregon contains six public school districts, many private schools, as well as public and private colleges and universities including Portland State University, the largest public university in Oregon.

Public elementary and secondary education

Portland is served by seven school districts, Beaverton, Parkrose, Lake Oswego, David Douglas, Centennial, Tigard-Tualatin, Reynolds, Riverdale, and Portland Public. The largest, Portland Public School District consists of about 100 schools covering, in various combinations, grades kindergarten through 12, as well as 50 special education programs. The number of students in the school district is approximately 53,000 — an enrollment of over 90% of the available school-age children, a higher percentage than other large urban school districts. Some of the elementary schools include; Abernethy, Scott, Bridlemile, and Peninsula. Some of the K8 schools are Martin Luther King Jr., Beverly Cleary, Bridger, and Hayhurst. Some of the middle schools are Jackson, George, and Mt. Tabor.

Parkrose and David Douglas school districts are also fully contained within the city. The Parkrose District has a single high school, a middle school and four elementary schools. Beaverton, Lake Oswego, Tigrad-Tualatin, Centennial, and Reynolds all primarily consist of suburb residents, but absorb suburban Portland and/or CDP residents.

Portland high schools

Private primary and secondary education
The region also has a number of private schools, including: Catlin Gabel School, Central Catholic High School, Jesuit High School, De La Salle North Catholic High School, Franciscan Montessori Earth School & Saint Francis Academy, French American International School, The International School, The Northwest Academy, Oregon Episcopal School, St. Mary's Academy, Tucker Maxon School, Trinity Academy, Trinity Lutheran Church and School, Portland Waldorf School, Portland Jewish Academy, Village Free School, Holy Family Catholic School, Columbia Christian Schools, Portland Christian Schools, Pacific Crest Community School, Village Home Education Resource Center and Choices Independent Learning, Summa Academy and Portland Adventist Academy.

Colleges and universities

Public colleges and universities

Portland State University, with graduate and undergraduate enrollment of over 26,000, is Oregon's largest university. Its primary campus is at the southern edge of downtown.

Oregon Health and Science University (OHSU) began as the University of Oregon Medical School in 1913.  In addition to its medical, nursing, and dental divisions (see below), it merged with the Oregon Graduate Institute of Science and Technology in 2001, taking on its current name and composition.

Portland Community College has two major campuses in the city—Cascade and Sylvania—as well as the smaller Southeast Center and Metropolitan Workforce Training Center. The third large campus—Rock Creek—is located outside of the city in unincorporated Washington County.

Private colleges and universities

Portland Bible College, Walla Walla University (School of Nursing), and Western Seminary are also located in the city.

Medical schools

OHSU has a major medical, dental, and nursing school at its primary campus just south of downtown, in the West Hills.  The campus anchors a medical district (affectionately called "Pill Hill") surrounded by other hospitals including a Veterans Affairs Hospital, Portland Shriners Hospital, and Doernbecher Children's Hospital.

Schools of alternative medicine include Oregon College of Oriental Medicine, the National University of Natural Medicine, and Western States Chiropractic College.

Law schools
Portland's only law school is Lewis & Clark Law School, affiliated with Lewis & Clark College.

Art schools
These include the Art Institute of Portland, Pacific Northwest College of Art, Oregon College of Art and Craft, Portland Fashion Institute and Northwest Film Center.

Other private schools
Oregon Culinary Institute
Pensole

Weekend educational programs
The Portland Japanese School, a weekend Japanese educational program for Japanese citizens and Japanese Americans, holds its classes at Hazelbrook Middle School at Tualatin and has its school office in Beaverton. The school first opened in 1971 and students come from areas throughout the Portland metropolitan area.

References